Kira Kirillovna of Russia (9 May 1909 – 8 September 1967) was the second daughter of Grand Duke Kirill Vladimirovich of Russia and Princess Victoria Melita of Saxe-Coburg and Gotha. She married Prince Louis Ferdinand of Prussia, grandson of the last German Emperor Wilhelm II.

Early life

Grand Duchess Kira Kirilovna of Russia was born on 9 May 1909, at her parents' house on Avenue d' Henri Martin in Paris. Named after her father, she was the second child of Kirill Vladimirovich, Grand Duke of Russia, and his wife, Princess Victoria Melita of Saxe-Coburg and Gotha. Her parents were then living in exile because their marriage had not been approved by Tsar Nicholas II due to the fact that they were first cousins. The Russian Orthodox religion forbids the marriage of two first cousins, so they had been forced to live abroad. In addition, her mother had divorced her former husband, Ernst Ludwig, Grand Duke of Hesse, the brother of the Empress Alexandra Feodorovna.

Shortly after Kira's birth, her parents were  restored to favor by Tsar Nicholas II and, in May 1910, the family returned to Russia. They settled at the Cavalier's house in Tsarskoye Selo as her father, a Captain in the Russian Navy, was attached to a nearby naval academy. Kira and her elder sister, Maria, had a privileged childhood. They had an English nanny and learned the languages spoken by the Romanovs: Russian, English, French, and German.

Kira's early years were spent in luxury at her father's palace at 13 Glinka Street in Saint Petersburg, where her parents entertained their guests lavishly. There were family outings with her grandmother at the opulent Vladimir Palace and in the summer at the Vladimir villa in Tsarskoye Selo.

World War I and Russian Revolution
The family was spending the summer of 1914 on their yacht in the Gulf of Finland and were in Riga when the war broke out. During World War I, Kira's father served as the commander of a unit of the Naval Guards, while her mother oversaw a motorized ambulance. At the outbreak of the Russian revolution, Kira's father marched to the Tauride Palace at the head of the Naval Guards before the establishment of the Russian Provisional Government.

Following the Russian Revolution of 1917, the family initially remained living at their palace amid the upheavals. In June, Kira's father obtained permission from the provisional government to move to Finland. Kira, eight at the time, recalled that they rode on a public train. "For the first time there were no royal trappings ... i.e. red carpets, special comforts, etc.," she recalled. In Finland, the family lived at Haiko Manor, Borga. A month later, her 40-year-old mother gave birth to a son, Vladimir. The family waited in Finland, hoping that the White guard would defeat the Bolsheviks and they could return to Russia. The family lived under harsh conditions, with food, fuel and money in short supply. Kira, then age nine, amused herself by taking long walks hunting for mushrooms, and as a treat went to the cinema every Friday. She later recalled feeling homesick and bored. Grand Duke Kirill's family stayed in Finland until May 1920.

Family
The family eventually left Finland and headed first to Coburg and then to Saint-Briac, France. Kira was born Princess Kira Kirillovna of Russia, but her father later gave her the title "Grand Duchess" when he declared himself Guardian of the Throne in 1924. Blonde-haired, blue-eyed Kira, high-spirited and straightforward, also had an even temper. She was intelligent, curious, and interested in the arts like her mother, with whom she worked in the art studio at Saint-Briac. Kira also frequently visited her cousins at various royal courts or attended house parties in the United Kingdom.

Grand Duchess Kira had some difficulty finding a suitable husband. She was interested in the hemophiliac  Alfonso of Spain, Prince of Asturias, son of Alfonso XIII of Spain, but was disappointed when the prince showed more interest in one of the daughters of Prince Nicholas of Greece. Later, she was fond of Prince Constantine "Teddy" Soutzo, a Romanian aristocrat. Her cousin Carol II of Romania refused to permit the match for political reasons. Finally, Kira married Louis Ferdinand of Prussia in 1938. They raised a family of four sons and three daughters in a village near Bremen, Germany. 

Her children were:

Prince Friedrich Wilhelm of Prussia (9 February 1939 – 29 September 2015); he married Waltraud Freydag on 22 August 1967 and they were divorced in 1975. They had one son and six grandchildren. He remarried Ehrengard von Reden on 23 April 1976 and they were divorced in 2004. They had three children and one grandson. He remarried, again, Sibylle Kretschmer on 23 March 2004.
Prince Philipp Kirill Friedrich Wilhelm Moritz Brosi Tanko von Preußen (b. 1968). He married Anna Christine Soltau (b. 1968) on 2 July 1994 and had children:
Prince Paul Wilhelm	Philipp Friedrich Alois Johannes Mose (b. 10 April 1995)
Princess Marie Luise Anna Philippa Julie Margarethe Elisabeth (b. 12 March 1997)
Princess Elisabeth Christine Philine Cécilie Annegret Solome Maria (b. 16 December 1998)
Princess Anna Sophie Phila Wilhelmine Amelie Elisabeth Maria (b. 26 March 2001)
Princess Johanna Amelie Kira Philippa Rose Elisabeth Maria (b. 10 September 2002)
Prince Timotheus Friedrich (b. 9 June 2005)
Prince Friedrich Wilhelm Ludwig Ferdinand Kirill von Preußen (b. 1979). He married Anna Catharina Freiin (Baroness) von Salza und Lichtenau (b. 1981) on 30 April 2009 and had two children:
Prince Friedrich Wilhelm (b. 2012)
Princess Charlotte
Princess Viktoria-Luise Kira Ehrengard von Preußen (b. 1982). She married Hereditary Prince Ferdinand of Leiningen (b. 1982) on 16 September 2017 and had two daughthers:
Alexandra Viktoria Luise Ehrengard Prinzessin zu Leiningen (b. 28/29 February 2020)
Feodora Prinzessin zu Leiningen (b. 16 August 2021)
Prince Joachim Albrecht Bernhard Christian Ernst von Preußen (b. 1984). He married Angelina Gräfin (Countess) zu Solms-Laubach (b. 1983) on 29 June 2019 and had two children:
Princess Georgina von Preußen (b. 2018)
Prince Caspian Friedrich Joachim Albrecht von Preußen (b. 2021)
 Prince Michael of Prussia (22 March 1940 – 3 April 2014); he married Jutta Jörn on 23 September 1966 and they were divorced in 1982. They had two daughters and two grandchildren. He remarried Birgitte Dallwitz-Wegner on 23 June 1982.
 Princess Marie Cécile of Prussia (born 28 May 1942); she married Duke Friedrich August of Oldenburg on 3 December 1965 and they were divorced on 23 November 1989. They have three children and eight grandchildren. 
 Princess Kira of Prussia (27 June 1943 – 10 January 2004); she married Thomas Liepsner on 10 September 1973 and they were divorced in 1984. They had one daughter and two granddaughters.
 Louis Ferdinand, Hereditary Prince of Prussia (25 August 1944 – 11 July 1977); he married Countess Donata of Castell-Rüdenhausen on 23 May 1975. They had two children (including Georg Friedrich, Prince of Prussia) and four grandchildren.  
 Prince Christian-Sigismund of Prussia (b. 14 March 1946); he married Countess Nina von Reventlow on 29 September 1984. They have two children and also he has another daughter. 
 Princess Xenia of Prussia (9 December 1949 – 18 January 1992); she married Per-Edvard Lithander on 27 January 1973 and they were divorced in 1978. They had two sons and six grandchildren.

After World War II
Kira was called upon to testify in the case of Anna Anderson, the woman who claimed to be Grand Duchess Anastasia Nikolaevna of Russia. Kira had met Anderson briefly in 1952 at the urging of her mother-in-law, Crown Princess Cecilie of Prussia, who believed Anderson's claim. Kira was not convinced. She found the woman "repellent" and "not a lady" and incapable of speaking the cultured English used by her family. Kira had last seen Anastasia when she was a child of seven. Kira's uncle, Grand Duke Andrei Vladimirovich of Russia had been convinced Anderson was Anastasia, but her father and mother were unconvinced by Anderson's claim.

In later years, Kira was disappointed when her eldest son, Friedrich Wilhelm, renounced his rights to the title and married a commoner. She also paid little heed to her health, putting on weight and suffering from high blood pressure in her fifties. She was in good spirits on a visit to her brother Grand Duke Vladimir of Russia at Saint-Briac in September 1967, where she ate well and dumped several spoonfuls of sugar into her coffee, commenting, "God forbid I should eat anything healthy!" That night, she suffered a heart attack and soon died.

Ancestry

References

Sources
Peter Kurth, Anastasia: The Riddle of Anna Anderson, Back Bay Books, 1983, 
Michael John Sullivan, A Fatal Passion: The Story of the Uncrowned Last Empress of Russia, Random House, 1997, 
John Van der Kiste, Princess Victoria Melita, Sutton Publishing, 1991, 

|-

|-

1909 births
1967 deaths
Nobility from Paris
House of Holstein-Gottorp-Romanov
Russian grand duchesses
Princesses of royal blood (Russia)
House of Hohenzollern
Emigrants from the Russian Empire to France
Prussian princesses
Dachau concentration camp survivors